Constitutionality of sex offender registries in the United States have been challenged on a number of constitutional and other bases, generating substantial amount of case law. The Supreme Court of the United States has upheld sex offender registration laws each of the two times such laws have been examined by them. Those challenging the sex offender registration and related restriction statutes have claimed violations of ex post facto, due process, cruel and unusual punishment, equal protection and search and seizure. A study published in fall 2015 found that statistics cited in two U.S. Supreme Court decisions that are often cited in decisions upholding the constitutionality of sex offender policies are unfounded. Several challenges to some parts of state level sex offender laws have been honored after hearing at the state level.

Underlying U.S. Supreme Court findings

Two U.S. Supreme Court decisions have been heavily relied upon by legislators, and other courts in their own constitutional decision, mainly upholding the registration and notification laws. In McKune v. Lile, 536 U.S. 24, 33 (2002) the Supreme Court upheld, in a 5-4 plurality opinion, a Kansas law that imposed harsher sentences on offenders who refused participating in a prison treatment program. In justifying conclusion, Justice Kennedy wrote that sex offenders pose "frightening and high risk of recidivism", which, "of untreated offenders has been estimated to be as high as 80%." This claim has been proved as false by scholars.<ref>Seto, M. C. (2008). 'Pedophilia and sexual offending against children. APA Press: Washington DC, pp. 142-143./</ref>

In following year, in Smith v. Doe, 538 U.S. 84 (2003), the Supreme Court upheld Alaska's registration statute, reasoning that sex offender registration is civil measure reasonably designed to protect public safety, not a punishment, which can be applied ex post facto. Now Justice Kennedy relied on this earlier language of McKune v. Lile and wrote:

Unfounded statistics
According to a study by law Professor Ira Mark Ellman and Consultant Tara Ellman, statistics cited by Justice Kennedy are "false 'facts. The study found that in McKune v. Lile, the solicitor general provided only one citation to support its claim "that the recidivism rate of untreated offenders has been estimated to be as high as 80%." According to the study, the source for the claim was the "U.S. Department of Justice, National Institute of Corrections, A Practitioner’s Guide to Treating the Incarcerated Male Sex Offender", released in 1988. The study found the Practitioners Guide itself cites only one source which originates from "a mass market magazine aimed at a lay audience", and was bare assertion with no supporting citations by a treatment program counselor, who is not a scholar and has no expertise in sex offender recidivism. Furthermore, the article was about counseling program the counselor run in Oregon prison, not about sex crime recidivism. The study concludes that the claim of high re-offense rates among all sex offenders, and the effectiveness of counseling programs in reducing it, was merely "unsupported assertion of someone without research expertise who made his living selling such counseling programs to prisons", and that use of the unsourced statistics in McKune v. Lile was irresponsible.

U.S. Supreme Court rulings
In two cases docketed for argument on 13 November 2003, the sex offender registries of two states, Alaska and Connecticut, would face legal challenge. This was the first instance that the Supreme Court had to examine the implementation of sex offender registries in throughout the U.S. The ruling would let the states know how far they could go in informing citizens of perpetrators of sex crimes. In Connecticut Dept. of Public Safety v. Doe (2002) the Supreme Court of the United States affirmed public disclosure of sex offender information.

Ex post facto challenge
In Smith v. Doe, 538 U.S. 84 (2003), the Supreme Court upheld Alaska's sex-offender registration statute. Reasoning that sex offender registration deals with civil laws, not punishment, the Court ruled 6–3 that it is not an unconstitutional ex post facto law. Justices John Paul Stevens, Ruth Bader Ginsburg, and Stephen Breyer dissented. However In July 2017, the Pennsylvania Supreme Court further ruled that Pennsylvania's retroactive application of SORNA penalties violated the ex post facto provisions of both the United States and Pennsylvania Constitution and as a result SORNA is currently not enforceable in the State of Pennsylvania.

Due process challenge
In Connecticut Dept. of Public Safety v. Doe, 538 U.S. 1 (2003), the Court ruled that Connecticut's sex-offender registration statute did not violate the procedural due process of those to whom it applied, although the Court "expresses no opinion as to whether the State's law violates substantive due process principles."

Federal Circuit Court of Appeals rulings
Fifth Circuit
In United States v. Kebodeaux (5th Cir., 2012), the  United States Fifth Circuit Court of Appeals rejected the argument that sex offender registry requirements could be based upon the commerce clause to the United States Constitution.http://www.ca5.uscourts.gov/opinions/pub/08/08-51185-CR3.wpd.pdf 

State court rulings

Alaska
On 25 July 2008, the Alaska Supreme Court ruled that the Alaska Sex Offender Registration Act's registration violated the ex post facto clause of the state's constitution and ruled that the requirement does not apply to persons who committed their crimes before the act became effective on 10 August 1994.

California
The California Supreme Court ruled on 2 March 2015 that a state law barring sex offenders from living within 2,000 feet of a school or park is unconstitutional. The ruling immediately affects only San Diego County, where the case originated. The court found that in San Diego County, the 2,000-feet rule meant that less than 3 percent of multi-unit housing was available to offenders. Additionally, federal law banned anyone in a state database of sex offenders from receiving federal housing subsidies after June 2001.

Florida
Florida passed a law that mandates law enforcement to notify the public of "sexual predators". This has led to some law enforcement agencies placing large red signs in front of the homes of serious sex offenders stating the name of the person and that they live at that address.  Florida is one of the most restrictive states in the US when it comes to sex offender laws.

Hawaii
In State v. Bani, 36 P.3d 1255 (Haw. 2001), the Hawaii State Supreme Court held that Hawaii's sex offender registration statute violated the due process clause of the Constitution of Hawaii, ruling that it deprived potential registrants "of a protected liberty interest without due process of law". The Court reasoned that the sex offender law authorized "public notification of (the potential registrant's) status as a convicted sex offender without notice, an opportunity to be heard, or any preliminary determination of whether and to what extent (he) actually represents a danger to society".

Maryland
In 2013 The Maryland Court of Appeals, the highest court of Maryland, declared that the state could not require the registration of people who committed their crimes before October 1995, when the database was established.

Michigan
U.S. District Court Judge Robert Cleland issued a ruling March 31, 2015 striking down four portions of Michigan's Sex Offender Registry Act, calling them unconstitutional. A ruling stated the "geographic exclusion zones" in the Sex Offender Registry Act, such as student safety areas that stretch for 1,000 feet around schools, are unconstitutional. Judge Cleland also stated law enforcement does not have strong enough guidelines to know how to measure the 1,000-foot exclusion zone around schools. Neither sex offenders or law enforcement have the tools or data to determine the zones.

On appeal the Sixth Circuit ruled that Michigan's 2006 amendments (which created the "geographic exclusion zones") and 2011 amendments which enhanced reporting requirements violated the expo facto laws.  The Supreme Court then denied cert on appeal.  In 2019 Judge Cleland gave legislature 90 days to rewrite the laws, which they did not.  In February, 2020 Judge Cleland again gave the legislature 90 days to make the laws constitutional and ruled that the current law would be null and void to all pre 2011 registrants after that date if the legislature fails to act. 

Missouri
Many successful challenges to sex offender registration laws in the United States have been in Missouri because of a unique provision in the Missouri Constitution (Article I, Section 13) prohibiting laws "retrospective in [their] operation".

In Doe v. Phillips, 194 S.W.3d 837 (Mo. banc 2006), the Supreme Court of Missouri held that the Missouri Constitution did not allow the state to place anyone on the registry who had been convicted or pleaded guilty to a registrable offense before the sex offender registration law went into effect on 1 January 1995 and remanded the case for further consideration in light of that holding. On remand, the Jackson County Circuit Court entered an injunction ordering that the applicable individuals be removed from the published sex offender list. Defendant Colonel James Keathley appealed that order to the Missouri Court of Appeals in Kansas City, which affirmed the injunction on 1 April 2008. Keathley filed an appeal with the Supreme Court of Missouri.

In response to these rulings, in 2007, several Missouri state Senators proposed an amendment to the Missouri Constitution that would exempt sex offender registration laws from the ban on retrospective civil laws. The proposed amendment passed the State Senate unanimously but was not passed by the Missouri House of Representatives before the end of the 2007 legislative session. The same constitutional amendment was proposed in and passed by the Missouri Senate again in 2008, but also was not passed by the House of Representatives by the end of that year's legislative session. As a result, the decisions of the Missouri courts prohibiting the retrospective application of sex offender laws remained intact.

The Missouri Supreme Court ruled on Keathley's appeal (Doe v. Phillips now styled Doe v. Keathley) on 16 June 2009. The Court held that the Missouri Constitution's provision prohibiting laws retrospective in operation no longer exempts individuals from registration if they are subject to the independent Federal obligation created under the Sexual Offenders Registration and Notification Act (SORNA), 42 U.S.C. § 16913. As a result, many offenders who were previously exempt under the Court's 2006 holding in Doe v. Phillips were once again required to register.

On 12 January 2010, Cole County Circuit Judge Richard Callahan ruled that individuals who plead guilty to a sex offense are not required to register under Federal Law and thus are not required to register in Missouri if the date of their plea was prior to the passage of the Missouri registration law.

New York
Local governments in New York cannot restrict where registered sex offenders can live, according to a ruling by the state's highest court published 31 May 2015. Under New York law, only level 3 offenders and those on probation or parole are prohibited from being within 1,000 feet of school grounds or a day care center.

North Carolina
§ 14-202.5 banned use of commercial social networking Web sites by sex offenders. Potentially this means that a registered offender could be charged by authorities for use of Google or other public internet sites. On August 20, 2013, the North Carolina Court of Appeals struck down the law, saying it is too vague, and violates free speech. On August 30, 2013, the NC Supreme Court grants NC Attorney General Roy Cooper's request for a stay of Court of Appeals ruling. That stay was granted but no other outcome from that stay has moved forward. The US Supreme Court struck down this law in Packingham v. North Carolina.

Ohio
In 2012, The Supreme Court of Ohio found automatic lifetime registration for juveniles to be unconstitutional.

Ohio Supreme Court has also ruled the Ohio version of Adam Walsh Act to be punitive, rather than a civil regulatory measure. This decision barred retroactive application of Ohio's Adam Walsh Act to those whose crimes predated the law's enactment.

Pennsylvania
In December 2014 the Pennsylvania Supreme Court ruled that Pennsylvania's sex offender registry for juvenile offenders was unconstitutional. In a 5-1 decision, the court concluded that the state, by making an "irrebuttable presumption" about adults' behavior based on crimes they committed as teens, violated their constitutional right to due process.

In July 2017, the Pennsylvania Supreme Court further ruled that Pennsylvania's retroactive application of SORNA penalties violated the ex post facto provisions of both the United States and Pennsylvania Constitution and additionally violated the Pennsylvania Constitutional protected freedom of reputation.

Academic commentary
Catherine Carpenter, Professor of law, and Amy E. Beverlin, J.D Candidate, write in their 2012 article, published in Hastings Law Journal, "The Evolution of Unconstitutionality in Sex Offender Registration Laws", that sex offender registration laws were initially anchored by rational basis but have since spiraled into what they characterize as "super-registration schemes". They argue that even if initial registration schemes were constitutional, the series of amendments piling up more penalties has turned the registration schemes unconstitutionally punitive. The article posits that the decisions in Smith v. Doe'' and Connecticut Dept. of Public Safety v. Doe upholding the registration schemes as civil regulations, leaving them immune to substantive due process and procedural due process requirements normally associated with criminal laws, combined with legislators who are eager "to draft increasingly harsh registration and notification schemes to please an electorate that subsists on a steady diet of fear", has led to runaway legislation that has become "unmoored from its initial constitutional grounding".

References

Sex offender registries in the United States